Artūras Masiulis is a retired professional Lithuanian basketball player whose position was center. His best years were in the 2001–2003 seasons as a center for Žalgiris and the 2005–2008 seasons with Šiauliai, during which time he became one of the best centers in the LKL.

Achievements 
 2001 year: LKL Champion
 2003 year: Estonian basketball league Bronze medal
 2006 year: Baltic Basketball League Bronze medal
 2006, 2007, 2008 years: Lithuanian Basketball League Bronze medals
 2008 year: LKF Cup Bronze medal

External links 
 Artūras Masiulis LKL.lt profile (Lithuanian)
 Artūras Masiulis NKLsmscredit.net profile (Lithuanian)

References 

1980 births
Living people
Lithuanian men's basketball players
People from Anykščiai
University of Tartu basketball team players
Centers (basketball)
Lithuanian expatriate basketball people in Estonia
Lithuanian expatriate basketball people in Romania
Lithuanian expatriate basketball people in Russia
Lithuanian expatriate basketball people in Hungary
Lithuanian expatriate basketball people in the United Kingdom